The dreadnought is a type of acoustic guitar body developed by American guitar manufacturer C.F. Martin & Company. The style, since copied by other guitar manufacturers, has become the most common for acoustic guitars.

A body much larger than most other guitars provided the dreadnought with a bolder, perhaps richer, and often louder tone. It is distinguished by its size and square shoulders and bottom. The neck is usually attached to the body at the fourteenth fret.

Martin dreadnought guitars are also known as "D-size" guitars. Their model numbers consist of "D-" followed by a number, such as "D-18" and "D-45". The higher the numerical designation, the more decorative ornamentation on the instrument.

History
The dreadnought style was developed in 1916 by Martin specifically for the retailer  Oliver Ditson Company. The model was retired after dismal sales. In 1931, after revising the design, Martin began producing dreadnought guitars under its own brand, the first two models named the D-1 and D-2, with bodies made of mahogany and rosewood respectively.

The popularity of and demand for Martin dreadnought guitars was increased by their use, almost exclusively, by folk musicians of the mid-20th century, including most bluegrass guitarists. Dreadnoughts became the standard guitar of bluegrass music, used by many bluegrass musicians to produce a signature sound.

Martin dreadnoughts manufactured prior to 1946 are highly desired by musicians due to their loud volume and exceptional tone due to the use of scalloped bracing. 

The Gibson Guitar Company's response to the Martin dreadnought was the round-shouldered Jumbo, which it introduced in 1934. It introduced its first square shouldered guitar, the Hummingbird, in 1960.

Since then, dreadnoughts have been made by nearly all major guitar manufacturers worldwide in both standard and more recently single-cutaway forms.

See also
Chiterra sarda, a traditional large-bodied guitar from Sardinia

References

External links

 What is a dreadnought guitar? on Sixstringsacoustic website
 What is a dreadnought guitar? on Guitarsurfer website

Acoustic guitars